Kuytun (Khüiten) is a rural locality (a selo) in Tarbagataysky District, Republic of Buryatia, Russia. The population was 767 as of 2010. There are 12 streets.

Geography 
Kuytun is located 32 km east of Tarbagatay (the district's administrative centre) by road. Nadeyino is the nearest rural locality.

References 

Rural localities in Tarbagataysky District